IKON Philippines is a reality singing competition which searches for a champion among existing or established artistes rather than among new, unknown starlets as in other such singing competitions. The programme was co-launched with IKON Indonesia and IKON Malaysia in late 2006 as an initiative to search for an artiste who can represent the country in the regional (ASEAN) level. The verdict is determined by 70% of jury marks and 30% SMS.

Ikon Philippines began its run on Le Pavilion in June 2007, and is hosted by Asia Agcaoili.

The final stage was held on 5 August 2007.Vina Morales is the Philippine Representative for Solo Category and Kjwan for Group Category

On August 5, 2007, both Vina Morales and Kjwan won the First Ikon Asean in their respective categories.

Vina Morales sang "Pangako Sa 'Yo" (A Promise to You), the theme song of the popular drama series of the same name in the Philippines, Malaysia and Indonesia, and "Feels so Nice".

Kjwan sang "Invitation" and "One Look".

Contenders

Solo
Noel Cabangon
Chris Cayzer
Julianne
Vina Morales (winner, solo category)
Sitti Navarro
Grace Nono
Skarlet
Top Suzara

Group/band
Chicosci
Chillitees
The Dawn
Greyhoundz
Kala
Kapatid
Kjwan (winner, band category)
Spongecola
Stone Free
True Faith

References

External links
Official Website
Official Broadcaster

Philippine reality television series
2007 Philippine television series debuts
2007 Philippine television series endings
Radio Philippines Network original programming